The Wackerbarth Palace, also known as the Dresdener Ritterakademie (German for "Knight's Academy of Dresden"), was a palace in Dresden, Germany, built between 1723 and 1729, under the supervision of architect Johann Christoph Knöffel (1686-1752). It was one of the several Baroque palaces in Dresden which were destroyed during the allied bombing raids on February 13, 1945. It was named for August Christoph Graf von Wackerbarth (1662-1734), a Saxon Duke and Field Marshal. The palace was situated in the city, north of the Elbe river, at the former Beaumontplatz near Neustädter Markt.

Badly damaged during the allied bombing raids, parts of it were still standing after the war. Reconstruction would have been possible, but it was demolished by government of German Democratic Republic (East Germany) in 1963. Presently there are no plans for a reconstruction project. However, a medallion with the image of Saxon King August the Strong, part of the facade ornaments made by famous baroque sculptor Benjamin Thomae, was saved and is now part of the Johanneum.

On the other hand, other palaces in Dresden, such as the Zwinger, Japanisches Palais, Residenzschloss, Taschenbergpalais, Palais Cosel and the Kurländer Palace, all heavily damaged by the allied raids, were reconstructed. Additionally, the Kurländer Palace is under reconstruction as of 2008.

External links
www.neumarkt-dresden.de Website of the GHND - Association for the reconstruction of the Dresden Neumarkt according to scientific standards
Photo of before allied raids
Photo after allied raids

Houses completed in 1729
Palaces in Dresden
Baroque architecture in Dresden
Buildings and structures demolished in 1963
1729 establishments in the Holy Roman Empire